Stelle is an unincorporated community located in Rogers Township in northern Ford County, Illinois, United States. Its estimated population as of 2013 is 100.

Although Stelle started as an intentional community in the early 1970s, it became a simple homeowner's association in 1982 when the community opened up and continues on to this day.

What is unique about Stelle is that many residents are interested in community living, sustainability, gardening, solar energy, wind power, permaculture and right livelihood.

Contemporary Stelle 
The Stelle Community Association is a living example of how residents can directly affect the management of their community. Many volunteers along with a few part-time paid staff give of their time and skill to deliver community services and create community events open to everyone.

Stelle residents manage their own telephone mutual and internet service (mostly from PV solar), fresh water treatment, waste water treatment, community center, and other common services.

The local non-profit, Center for Sustainable Community (CSC), hosts a handful of cooperatives for interested residents including a tool co-op, garden co-op and chicken co-op.  In 2012 they launched an inspiring permaculture design for their 8.7 acres of land situated immediately next to the community.

CSC continues to offer occasional open houses and educational events about sustainable living often in conjunction with Midwest Permaculture.

Midwest Permaculture, an educational business offering permaculture training in Stelle and around the U.S., was started and developed by two Stelle residents and contributes to the national conversation about why and how the human family should learn to live in harmony with each other and the natural world. Midwest Permaculture's training sessions have been strongly influenced by the founders' three decades of living in Stelle; participants learn the skills necessary to create long-term, productive, and healthy landscapes/dwellings as well as skills important for building authentic community.

Historical overview 

Stelle is a small village in N.E. Illinois that began as an intentional community during the early 1970s.  The founding residents belonged to a recently formed group from Chicago, whose vision was to create a more sustainable and compassionate way of living. The group purchased a farm in the northern tip of Ford County and built a traditional-looking suburban community.  Stelle  maintained itself as a private community for about ten years, at which point a majority of the residents decided to govern themselves through a conventional homeowner's association and become an open village with no formal residency requirements.

During those first ten years, Stelle residents discovered that it is easier to agree on a positive vision for the future than to agree on the steps necessary to manifest that future. Stelle was one of thousands of intentional communities that sprang up during the 1960s and 1970s whose highly idealistic visions for the future have not yet been achieved.  However, building these communities did provide valuable learning experiences for many.

After Stelle transitioned to a "normal" village in 1982, it became notable for its suburban design, the solar panels on many homes, and the residents' enthusiasm for lifelong education and co-operative enterprises. The village has its own telephone company, which provides telephone, television, and internet access. Stelle also boasts a community garden co-op, a tool co-op, a Monday night dinner co-op, and hosts a variety of educational events that are open to the public.

Early history 
Although the early history of Stelle (1970–1982) is mostly irrelevant to what is happening in the community today, those who study intentional community, or who wish to participate in community living, often find Stelle's early history of interest.

Stelle was founded in 1973 by the Stelle Group, a Chicago organization created by Richard Kieninger, a writer and teacher who was also instrumental in founding Adelphi, Texas. During the 1950s, Kieninger had been a student of the Lemurian Fellowship in Ramona, California, where he was instructed in a set of beliefs called “Lemurian Philosophy.” In his book The Ultimate Frontier (written in 1963 under the pen name “Eklal Kueshana”), Kieninger outlined the tenets of Lemurian philosophy, as well as further teachings he claimed were given to him by ancient, secretive organizations called the “Brotherhoods.”  The Ultimate Frontier sold over a quarter of a million copies and attracted worldwide interest in the new community.

The teachings Kieninger attributed to the Brotherhoods included a prediction that cataclysmic earth changes were to occur on May 5, 2000, as well as recommendations for individual advancement through education, practice of Twelve Great Virtues and an emphasis on right action to improve one's karma. In order to provide a physical setting where individuals could more easily practice the Brotherhoods’ teachings, the Stelle Group bought land in northern Ford County, Illinois, where members built a sewage treatment plant, a water treatment plant, roads, streets, underground utilities, a factory, a school and the first twenty-five homes. Mr. Kieninger predicted that this new town would grow to a population of 250,000 people by the year 2000. However, Stelle's distance from major job markets, stringent membership requirements, and lack of funding prevented the community from growing beyond its peak population of 200.

Mismanagement also took a toll; initially in 1975, then again during the mid-1980s, Kieninger became unwelcome in Stelle because of, among other things, his tendency to abuse his position and engage in multiple affairs with young Stelle women. Many of Stelle's residents followed him there, and Adelphi grew to a peak population of 30 before declining to its present size of 16. Residence in Adelphi is open only to members of the Adelphi Organization, which continues to teach the tenets of Lemurian philosophy and make available Kieninger's writings. All date-specific predictions have been removed from the current edition of The Ultimate Frontier, though references remain as to the eventual occurrence of cataclysmic earth changes.

During the fifty years since publication of The Ultimate Frontier, several thousand people from all parts of the globe have participated in funding and building the two communities. These participants form an informal network of Stelle/Adelphi “graduates” who occasionally return to Stelle for the annual Fourth of July celebration, or who attend reunions in other locales to reminisce and discuss philosophical issues and current events.

At Stelle's inception, the private homes and Stelle's one factory were owned by Stelle Industries Inc., whose four divisions (Stelle Woodworking, Stelle Construction, Stelle Plastics, and the Stelle Piano Shop) employed many Stelle residents. Most of the homes were transferred to a form of co-operative ownership after 1976. By the mid-1980s, Stelle Industries, Inc. had discontinued its operations, and the factory was eventually purchased by a longtime Stelle resident.

The school, the community center, the water treatment plant, and the sewage treatment plant were originally owned and operated by the Stelle Group. Many early residents were employed in support positions to handle correspondence, design and operate the public utilities and manage the affairs of the rapidly growing community.

Following a 1982 referendum, membership in the Stelle Group was dropped as a prerequisite for residence in the Stelle community. The population stabilized, and a newly formed, conventional homeowner's association, the Stelle Community Association,  took over operation of the sewer and water services and administration of democratic decision-making.  The Stelle Group continued its operations with reduced membership and staff, and its philosophical perspective changed over time. In early 2005, the few remaining Stelle Group members decided to disband and liquidate the organization's assets— the school, the community center, an orchard, a community garden, a pond, a greenhouse, a storage building, and about 170 acres (700,000 m²) of farmland adjoining the village.

In late 2005, the Center for Sustainable Community (CSC), an educational organization that maintains its headquarters in Stelle, purchased the orchard, the community garden, the pond, the greenhouse, and the storage building. The remaining farmland was purchased by a local organic farmer.

Geography
Stelle is located at 40°57′00″N 88°09′13″W (40.9500329, -88.1533814).[1] The legal description of Stelle's geography is: The 2nd Resubdivision of Stelle Subdivision No. 1, located in the NE quarter of Section 35, T29N, R9E of the 3rd PM, Rogers Township, Ford County, Illinois. The Stelle Subdivision—AKA Stelle, IL—covers about 40 acres (160,000 m2).

Further reading

References

External links 

Intentional communities in the United States
Populated places established in 1973
Unincorporated communities in Ford County, Illinois
1973 establishments in Illinois